Zeman (feminine Zemanová) is a Czech and Slovak surname. The word originally denoted a member of low nobility. Notable people with the surname include:

Culture and science
 Brock Zeman, Canadian singer-songwriter 
 Jacklyn Zeman (born 1953), an American actress
 Karel Zeman (1910–1989), Czech filmmaker
 Ludmila Zeman (born 1947), Czech-Canadian artist, animator, and creator of children's book
 Ned Zeman (born 1966), writer and screenwriter
 Zbyněk Zeman (1928–2011), Czech historian

Politics and business
 Allan Zeman (born 1949), Hong Kong businessman
 Edward J. Zeman (1905-1966), American politician
 Ivana Zemanová, wife of Miloš Zeman
 Miloš Zeman (born 1944), Czech president

Sport

American football
 Bob Zeman (born 1937), American football defensive back
 Ed Zeman (born 1963), American football player

Association football
 David Zeman (born 1942), Czech association football player
 Josef Zeman (footballer) (1915–1999), Czech footballer
 Marián Zeman (born 1974), Slovak association football player
 Martin Zeman (born 1989), Czech association football player
 Michal Zeman (born 1984), Czech footballer
 Walter Zeman (1927–1991), Austrian football goalkeeper 
 Zdeněk Zeman (born 1947), Czech-Italian football coach

Ice hockey
 Adam Zeman (born 1991), Czech ice hockey player
 Jiří Zeman (born 1982), Czech ice hockey defenceman

Other
 Andrea Zemanová, Czech freestyle skier
 Bohumír Zeman (born 1957), Czech alpine skier
 Irena Zemanová, Czech figure skater
 Jaromír Zeman (1886–?), Czech tennis player
 Jaroslav Zeman (born 1962), Czech Olympic wrestler
 Jindřich Zeman (born 1950), Czechoslovakian luger
 Lenka Zemanová, Czech triathlete
 Miroslav Zeman (born 1946), Czech Olympic wrestler
 Štěpán Zeman, Czech handball player

See also
Zeeman (disambiguation)

References

Czech-language surnames
Surnames from status names